China Central Television (CCTV) is a national television broadcaster of China, established in 1958 as a propaganda outlet. Its 50 channels broadcast a variety of programming to more than one billion viewers in six languages. CCTV is operated by the National Radio and Television Administration which reports directly to the Chinese Communist Party (CCP)'s Central Propaganda Department.

CCTV has a variety of functions, such as news communication, social education, culture, and entertainment information services. As a state television station it is responsible to both the Central Committee of the Chinese Communist Party and the State Council. It is a key player in the Chinese government's propaganda network. CCTV's reporting about topics sensitive to the Chinese government and CCP is distorted and often used as a weapon against the party's perceived enemies, according to Freedom House and other media commentators.

History
In 1954, CCP chairman Mao Zedong put forward that China should establish its own TV station. On 5 February 1955, the central broadcasting bureau reported to the State Council and proposed the program of establishing a medium-sized television station, later on premier Zhou Enlai included in China's first five-year plan the planned introduction of television broadcasts. In December 1957, the central broadcasting bureau sent Luo Donghe and Meng Qiyu to the Soviet Union and the German Democratic Republic for the inspection of their TV stations (see Television in the Soviet Union and Deutscher Fernsehfunk), then the duo returned to Beijing to prepare for the establishment of the TV station.

On 1 May 1978, Beijing Television was officially renamed China Central Television in time for its 20th anniversary and a new logo debuted.

Until the late 1970s, CCTV held only evening broadcasts, usually closing down at midnight. During the summer and winter academic vacations, it occasionally transmitted daytime programming for students, while special daytime programs were aired during national holidays. In 1980, CCTV experimented with news relays from local and central television studios via microwave. In 1984, CCTV established the subsidiary China International Television Corporation (CITVC).

By 1985, CCTV had already become a leading television network in China. In 1987, CCTV's grew due to the adaptation and presentation of Dream of the Red Chamber, the first Chinese television drama to enter the global market. In the same year, CCTV exported 10,216 show to 77 foreign television stations.

Initially, the CCP's Central Propaganda Department issued directive censorship of programs. During reform in the 1990s, it adopted new standards for CCTV, "affordability" and "acceptability", loosening the previous government control. Affordability refers to purchasing ability of programs, while acceptability requires that a program has acceptable content, preventing the broadcast of material that contains inappropriate content or expresses views against the CCP.

On 17 June 2013, CCTV announced that most of the broadcast facilities for the CCTV network have been relocated to the current headquarters building.

In March 2018, as the nation began marking the 60th year of television, CCTV ownership changed hands to a new state holding group, the China Media Group, as the television arm of the newly launched multimedia broadcasting conglomerate operated by both the Central Committee of the CCP and the State Council.

Overseas broadcasting 

In 1990, CCTV subsidiary, CITVC, established China Television Corporation in California to distribute CCTV content in the U.S. In 2000, CCTV's all-English channel, known as CCTV-9 or CCTV International, was launched.

In 2001, the Great Foreign Propaganda Plan was launched by Xu Guangchun, the head of SARFT, also the deputy head of the Publicity Department of the Chinese Communist Party after the urgency of bringing the voice of China to the world was presented by Jiang Zemin, former General Secretary of the Chinese Communist Party. The idea of an English channel was brought out in 1996. CCTV-4 had three half-hour English news broadcasting every day, but later, on 25 September 2000, CCTV-9 a satellite channel was set up to be the first 24-hour English channel, aimed to establish the overseas market. In October 2001, CCTV partnered with AOL Time Warner and other foreign news corporations, giving them access to the Chinese media market in exchange for cable delivery in the US and Europe, mainly delivering CCTV-9 programs.

The CCTV-4 channel split into three separate channels on 1 April 2007—each serving different time zones: China Standard Time (CST), Greenwich Mean Time (GMT), and Eastern Standard Time (EST)—in order to improve service for audiences around the world.

On 25 July 2009, CCTV launched its Arabic-language international channel, stating that it aims to maintain stronger links with Arab nations.

In 2015 and 2018, CCTV signed cooperation agreements with Russian state media outlet RT.

In December 2016, CCTV's foreign language services were spun off into China Global Television Network (CGTN).

China Network Television 

China Network Television (CNTV) was an internet-based broadcaster of China Central Television which launched on 28 December 2009.

2009 fire 

On 9 February 2009, the Beijing Television Cultural Center caught fire on the last day of the festivities of Chinese New Year, killing one firefighter. The blaze rendered the 42-story structure unusable, as the zinc and titanium alloy of the outer skin was burnt.

The fire had implications for the credibility of CCTV, which was already unpopular because of its dominance in the media. The incident was mocked by netizens who reproduced photoshopped photos of the fire and criticized CCTV for censoring coverage. Pictures of the fire are widely distributed on the internet, as a result of citizen journalism.

Libyan Civil War 
During the 2011 military intervention in Libya, reports from CCTV tended to support Muammar Gaddafi's arguments, claiming that the coalition forces attacked Libyan civilians and the military intervention was no different from an invasion. In some of the news reports, CCTV used images of demonstrators and said that they were against NATO's military intervention. CCTV also mislabeled a person holding a banner which said "Vive la France" ("long live France" in French) and claimed that he was a supporter of Gaddafi. Later on 27 March, a Chinese banner that said "Muammar Gaddafi is a lier. " was shown in some Libyan demonstration videos on the Internet.

2019 NBA free speech dispute
In 2019, CCTV announced that they were cancelling the broadcast of two National Basketball Association preseason games in response to a tweet by the General Manager of the Houston Rockets, Daryl Morey, in support of pro-democracy protests in Hong Kong. After Adam Silver defended the General Manager's right to free speech, CCTV responded with, "We express our strong dissatisfaction and opposition to Silver's stated support of Morey's right to free speech. We believe any remarks that challenge national sovereignty and social stability do not belong to the category of free speech," and continued, "We will also immediately examine all other cooperation and exchanges with the NBA."

Censorship and disinformation about the 2022 Russian invasion of Ukraine 

During the 2022 Winter Paralympics, CCTV censored a speech by International Paralympic Committee president Andrew Parsons condemning the 2022 Russian invasion of Ukraine. CCTV promoted Russian disinformation such as unsubstantiated claims of biological weapons labs in Ukraine. In April 2022, CCTV repeated Russian claims that the Bucha massacre was staged.

Censorship during the 2022 COVID-19 protests 

During the 2022 COVID-19 protests in China, CCTV's coverage of the 2022 FIFA World Cup censored scenes of maskless fans in the stadium. CCTV avoided coverage of the protests directly.

Organization
China Central Television, as a component of the CMG, falls under the supervision of the National Radio and Television Administration which is in turn subordinate to the State Council of the People's Republic of China. A vice minister of the State Council serves as chairman of CCTV, which has relationships with regional television stations run by local governments, which must reserve up to two channels for the national broadcaster.

The organization is considered one of the "big three" state media outlets in China, along with the People's Daily and Xinhua News Agency.

Management
The current president of CCTV is Shen Haixiong, who was appointed in February 2018.

Programs
CCTV produces its own news broadcasts three times a day and is the country's most powerful and prolific television program producer. Its thirty-minute evening news, Xinwen Lianbo ("CCTV Network News" or "CCTV Tonight"), goes on air daily at 7:00 pm Beijing time. All local stations are required to carry CCTV's news broadcast. An internal CCTV survey indicates that nearly 500 million people countrywide regularly watch this program.

Focus, first introduced in 1994, is a popular CCTV show which regularly exposes the wrongdoings of local officials, which attracts serious attention from higher levels of government. It also exposes the Chinese government's response to charges of corruption.

The CCTV New Year's Gala—a yearly special program for the Chinese New Year—is the most-watched CCTV show.

In 2003, CCTV launched its first 24-hour news channel, initially available to cable viewers.

Channels

Audience share 

In 2007, China's television audience rose to 1.2 billion. The 2008 Summer Olympics coverage on CCTV resulted in an aggregate 41% audience share across its network. As content becomes more diversified, there have been concerns about the audience share, as CCTV is losing out to cable, satellite and regional networks. In Guangzhou for example, CCTV programming only accounts for 45% of the weekly audience share, while in Shanghai, local stations also have share over CCTV. However, the CCTV New Year's Gala remains extremely popular; it acquires more than 90% audience share over the nation.

Personalities 
Producing a variety of different programming, China Central Television has a number of different program hosts, news anchors, correspondents, and contributors who appear throughout daily programing on the network.

 Ai Hua
 Bai Yansong
 Bao Xiaofeng
 Daniela Anahí Bessia
 Bi Fujian
 Chai Jing
 Chai Lu
 Chen Yin
 Dashan
 Dong Hao
 Dong Qing
 Marc Edwards
 Gao Bo
 Gang Qiang
 Guo Zhijian
 Hai Xia
 He Hongmei
 He Jing
 He Jia
 Hu Die
 Huang Wei
 Ji Xing
 Ji Yu
 Jin Qiang
 Jing Yidan
 Ju Ping
 Vimbayi Kajese
 Kang Hui
 Lao Chunyan
 Michele Lean
 Long Yang
 Li Ruiying
 Li Sisi
 Li Tongtong
 Li Wenjing
 Li Xiaomeng
 Li Yong 
 Li Zimeng
 Liang Yan
 Liu Chunyan
 Lu Jian
 Edwin Maher
 Ma Yue
 Miao Kai
 Na Sen
 Ouyang Xiadan
 Pan Tao
 Peng Kun
 Qi Qi
 Negmat Rahman
 Ren Luyu
 Rui Chenggang
 Sa Beining
 Shang Liang
 Shi Dan
 Sun Yan
 Shui Junyi
 Tang Jian
 Wang Ning (male)
 Wang Ning (female)
 Wang Xiaoya
 Wang Yan
 Xiao Yan
 Xu Li
 Xu Zhuoyang
 Yan Fang
 Yan Yuxin
 Yang Yi
 Yao Zhenshan
 Zhang Yu
 Zhang Hongmin
 Zhang Mengmeng
 Zhang Tengyue
 Zhang Zhonglu
 Zheng Tianliang
 Zhou Tao
 Zhu Guangquan
 Zhu Hong
 Zhu Huan
 Zhu Jun
 Zhu Xiaolin
 Zhu Xun

Reception
The network's principal directors and other officers are appointed by the State, and so are the top officials at local conventional television stations in mainland China; nearly all of them are restricted to broadcasting within their own province or municipality. Editorial independence is subject to government policy considerations, and as a result, its history and news channels have been charged with being "propaganda aimed at brainwashing the audience" in a letter written by a number of Chinese intellectuals who also called for a boycott of state media was posted on a US-based website and has circulated through Chinese websites. The network often publishes misleading and false information, particularly as it pertains to issues considered sensitive by the Chinese government. However, only a small percentage of the Network's programming can be described as "abusive or demonizing propaganda."

Journalists working for the network's English-language international channel, CGTN, as well as of the other non-Chinese language TV channels under the CGTN banner, are under constant pressure to present a positive account of China, according to Anne-Marie Brady's study published in 2008. "In August 2005, a series of items reported factually on the coal mining disaster in China; soon after the channel's leaders received a warning from the Ministry of Foreign Affairs that its reports were harming China's international image. Following this incident, senior editorial staff and journalists were all forced to write self-criticisms."

Brady says that while the channel's equipment is state-of-the-art, the employees are not well trained in how to use it, so there are frequent errors during a broadcast. "The political controls on the station contribute to a generally low level of morale and initiative among station staff," she writes.

A study done by the observer of Chinese film and television, Ying Zhu, suggests that "CCTV is full of serious-minded creators who regularly experience bouts of self-doubt, philosophical ambivalence, and in some cases, clinical depression." During her extensive interviews with key CCTV players, Zhu notes that "Certain common themes, about ideals, distorted or altogether thwarted by commercial and political pressure, emerged."

According to Freedom House, CCTV "has a consistent record of blatantly and egregiously violating journalistic standards and encouraging or justifying hatred and violence against innocent people. CCTV is an essential component of the CCP's brutal authoritarian regime and should be treated as such."

In 2020, the United States Department of State designated CCTV as a foreign mission, which requires it to disclose more about its operations in the U.S.

Incidents 
Since its inception CCTV has served as a tool of state power and as such has been complicit in human rights abuses. They have a history of demonizing and inciting hatred against those perceived as foes by the CCP, in this way they can be used to mobilize against threats as diverse as Falun Gong and international human rights groups.

1990s Falun Gong crackdown 
In 1999, during the first crackdown on Falun Gong, CCTV's Focus Talk ran 28 episodes over a 32-day period which defamed practitioners and incited hatred against them. In 2001, they deceptively claimed that a group of people who had set themselves on fire in Tiananmen Square were Falun Gong adherents, a claim which was characterized as "clearly abusive" by the Canadian regulatory commission.

Xinwen Lianbo and internet purity 
On 27 December 2007, Xinwen Lianbo aired a report about the wide and easy availability of explicit content on the internet. The report appealed to juristic institutions and government to hurry to make relevant legislation in order to purify the internet environment. In the report, a young student described a pop-up advertisement she saw as being "very erotic very violent". After the airing of the report, many parodies were posted by internet users ridiculing the comment and CCTV's credibility in part. The incident also questioned the reliability of Xinwen Lianbo, noting the unlikelihood of a web page being both violent and erotic at the same time (even though such pages do exist), and the age of the student interviewed. Personal information of the interviewed girl was later also leaked, identifying the girl in the report by name. Online message boards were populated by large threads about the incident, and a satirical work even stated that CCTV's website was the number one "very erotic very violent" website on the internet, with some users even creating their own toplists of sites which meet these criteria, the "top 8 very erotic very violent sports events" and even identifying things that are yellow as being erotic (since 黄, huáng, the Chinese character for "yellow", also means "erotic").

Xinwen Lianbo and fake imagery 
On 23 January 2011, Xinwen Lianbo showcased the Chengdu J-10 firing a missile at a plane, causing it to explode. The footage lasted half a second and the destroyed plane shown was later identified as that of an F-5E, a US fighter jet. The clip was later revealed to have been taken from the 1986 US movie Top Gun.

Comments by CCTV head Hu Zhanfan 
In 2011, the new CCTV head Hu Zhanfan "was found to have proclaimed in July [or January, both before the CCTV appointment in November] that journalists' foremost responsibility is to 'be a good mouthpiece'" (当好喉舌工具). Internet posts of the comment blossomed after the appointment, one "juxtapos[ing] CCTV's ... Xinwen Lianbo (新闻联播) and photos of Chinese crowds waving red flags with black-and-white images from Nazi-era Germany". Comparisons with the Nazi propaganda chief Joseph Goebbels (gepei'er also spread. Official media coverage of the Zhanfan's presentation focused on his call to avoid "fake news and false reports (失实报道)" but also incorporated the "mouthpiece" comment.

Broadcasting forced confessions 
CCTV regularly broadcasts the forced confessions of accused or convicted criminals and produces programming to go along with them. These programs are often filmed before the beginning of formal judicial procedures. Domestic dissidents such as lawyers, journalists, and activists as well as foreigners have been the victim of this practice.

In 2013 Peter Humphrey and Charles Xue's forced confessions were aired on CCTV. Since being freed, Humphrey has been highly critical of CCTV and the practice of airing forced confessions. In 2020, the British media regulator Ofcom sided with Humphrey and announced sanctions against CGTN, which aired Humphrey's confession and was branded as CCTV News at the time.

In 2014, CCTV broadcast the forced confession of the then-septuagenarian journalist Gao Yu.

In 2016, Peter Dahlin and Gui Minhai's forced confessions were aired on CCTV. In 2019 Dahlin filed a complaint against China Global Television Network (CGTN) and China Central Television-4 (CCTV-4) with Canadian authorities.

On 21 November 2019, CCTV's international arm CGTN aired a video of a forced confession from Hong Kong activist Simon Cheng. Within a week, Cheng had filed a new complaint to Ofcom over the broadcast.

In 2020, the forced confession of Taiwanese citizen Lee Meng-chu was aired on a CCTV program. A day later, the same program aired the forced confession of an academic from Taiwan accused of espionage and separatist activities.

See also 

 Mass media in China
 Television in the People's Republic of China

References

External links 

 

 
Censorship in China
Mass media companies established in 1958
Foreign television channels broadcasting in the United Kingdom
Publicly funded broadcasters
Companies based in Beijing
Chinese-language television stations
Television channels and stations established in 1958
Cable television in Hong Kong
Multilingual news services
1958 establishments in China
Mass media in Beijing
China Media Group
Chinese propaganda organisations
Disinformation operations